Division is a taxonomic rank in biological classification that is used differently in zoology and in botany.

In botany and mycology, division refers to a rank equivalent to phylum. The use of either term is allowed under the International Code of Botanical Nomenclature, and both are commonly used in scientific literature.

The main Divisions of land plants, in the order in which they probably evolved, are the Marchantiophyta (liverworts),  Anthocerotophyta (hornworts), Bryophyta (mosses), Filicophyta (ferns), Sphenophyta (horsetails), Cycadophyta (cycads), Ginkgophyta (ginkgo)s, Pinophyta (conifers), Gnetophyta (gnetophytes), and the Magnoliophyta (Angiosperms, flowering plants). The flowering plants now dominate terrestrial ecosystems, comprising 80% of vascular plant species.

In zoology, the term division is applied to an optional rank subordinate to the infraclass and superordinate to the cohort. A widely used classification (e.g. Carroll 1988) recognises teleost fishes as a Division Teleostei within Class Actinopterygii (the ray-finned fishes). Less commonly (as in Milner 1988), living tetrapods are ranked as Divisions Amphibia and Amniota within the clade of vertebrates with fleshy limbs (Sarcopterygii).

References

Works cited

Scientific classification
Botanical nomenclature